Jane Monheit (born November 3, 1977) is an American jazz and pop singer.

Early life
Monheit was born and raised in Oakdale, New York, on Long Island. Her father played banjo and guitar. Her mother sang and played music for her by singers who could also be her teachers, beginning with Ella Fitzgerald. At an early age Monheit was drawn to jazz and Broadway musicals.

She began singing professionally while attending Connetquot High School in Bohemia, New York. She attended the Usdan Summer Camp for the Arts. At the Manhattan School of Music she studied voice under Peter Eldridge; she graduated in 1999.

She was runner-up to Teri Thornton in the 1998 vocal competition at the Thelonious Monk Institute of Jazz, in Washington, DC.

Career
When she was 22, she released her first album, Never Never Land (N-Coded, 2000). Like Fitzgerald, she recorded many songs from the Great American Songbook. After recording for five labels, she started her own, Emerald City Records. Its first release was The Songbook Sessions (2016), an homage to Fitzgerald.

Monheit's vocals were featured in the 2010 film Never Let Me Go for the titular song, written by Luther Dixon, and credited to the fictional Judy Bridgewater.

Discography

Studio albums

Live albums

Guest appearances

References

External links

 Official site
 YouTube channel
 Jane Monheit biography, CD and concert reviews by cosmopolis.ch
 

1977 births
21st-century American women singers
21st-century American singers
American women jazz singers
American jazz singers
Concord Records artists
Jazz musicians from New York (state)
Living people
Manhattan School of Music alumni
People from Oakdale, New York
Sony Classical Records artists